Alfred Paul Murrah (October 27, 1904 – October 30, 1975) was a United States circuit judge of the United States Court of Appeals for the Tenth Circuit and previously was a United States district judge of the United States District Court for the Eastern District of Oklahoma, the United States District Court for the Northern District of Oklahoma and the United States District Court for the Western District of Oklahoma.

Education and career

Born on October 27, 1904, in Tishomingo, Indian Territory (now Oklahoma), Murrah received a Bachelor of Laws in 1928 from the University of Oklahoma College of Law. He entered private practice in Oklahoma City, Oklahoma from 1928 to 1929, then continued his practice in Seminole, Oklahoma and Oklahoma City from 1929 to 1937.

Federal judicial service

Murrah was nominated by President Franklin D. Roosevelt on February 8, 1937, to the United States District Court for the Eastern District of Oklahoma, the United States District Court for the Northern District of Oklahoma and the United States District Court for the Western District of Oklahoma, to a new joint seat authorized by 49 Stat. 1804. He was confirmed by the United States Senate on February 25, 1937, and received his commission on March 3, 1937. His service terminated on September 9, 1940, due to his elevation to the Tenth Circuit.

Murrah was nominated by President Roosevelt on August 5, 1940, to a seat on the United States Court of Appeals for the Tenth Circuit vacated by Judge Robert E. Lewis. He was confirmed by the Senate on August 29, 1940, and received his commission on September 4, 1940. He served as Chief Judge and as a member of the Judicial Conference of the United States from 1959 to 1970. He served as the Chair of the Judicial Panel on Multidistrict Litigation from 1968 to 1975. He assumed senior status on May 1, 1970. He was the last appeals court judge who continued to serve in active service appointed by President Roosevelt. He served as Director of the Federal Judicial Center from 1970 to 1974. His service terminated on October 30, 1975, due to his death in Oklahoma City.

Federal building

Murrah was the namesake of the Alfred P. Murrah Federal Building, a federal office complex which was destroyed in the Oklahoma City bombing on April 19, 1995.

References

Sources
 
 

1904 births
1975 deaths
People from Tuttle, Oklahoma
People from Tishomingo, Oklahoma
Methodists from Oklahoma
Judges of the United States Court of Appeals for the Tenth Circuit
Judges of the United States District Court for the Eastern District of Oklahoma
Judges of the United States District Court for the Northern District of Oklahoma
Judges of the United States District Court for the Western District of Oklahoma
Oklahoma Democrats
United States court of appeals judges appointed by Franklin D. Roosevelt
20th-century American judges
United States district court judges appointed by Franklin D. Roosevelt
University of Oklahoma College of Law alumni
20th-century American lawyers